Le Tocq is a surname. Notable people with the surname include:

 Jonathan Le Tocq (born 1964), Guernsey politician
 Paul Le Tocq (born 1981), Guernsey badminton player

French-language surnames
Surnames of British Isles origin